Sagolband Legislative Assembly constituency is one of the 60 Legislative Assembly constituencies of Manipur state in India.

It is part of Imphal West district.

Members of the Legislative Assembly

Election results

2017

See also
 List of constituencies of the Manipur Legislative Assembly
 Imphal West district

References

External links
 

Imphal West district
Assembly constituencies of Manipur